Heather Craney (born 1971) is an English actress, known for portraying Joyce Drake in Vera Drake, Alison Weaver in Life of Riley and Emily Holroyd in Torchwood.

Background
Craney was born in Stapleford, Cambridgeshire.

Her family lived in Darlington for two years during the 1980s, where Craney attended Hummersknott School. She attended Stapleford Community Primary School, Sawston Village College and Long Road Sixth Form College in Cambridgeshire, and went on to study English and drama at Liverpool Hope University, graduating in 1992. She trained in Acting and Musical Theatre at the Central School of Speech and Drama, graduating in 1995.

Career
Craney has appeared in the Mike Leigh films Topsy-Turvy (1999), All or Nothing (2002) and Vera Drake (2004), for which she was nominated for the 2005 BAFTA Award for Best Actress in a Supporting Role. Her other film credits include Drinking Crude (1997), Loop (1997) and Dangerous Parking (2007).

On television, Craney played Alison Weaver in the sitcom Life of Riley, and Cheryl Matthews in EastEnders. She also played Emily Holroyd in the Torchwood episode "Fragments". She has also appeared in Silent Witness, The Bill, Holby City and the television films The Mark of Cain and Ahead of the Class. In May 2022, she appeared in an episode of the BBC soap opera Doctors as Sian Corcoran.

Craney's theatre credits include Death of an Elephant, Dangerous Corner, Sugar Mummies, Stoning Mary and Passion Play, at the Donmar Warehouse.

Filmography

Theatre

References

External links

People from Stapleford, Cambridgeshire
Alumni of Liverpool Hope University
Alumni of the Royal Central School of Speech and Drama
English television actresses
English film actresses
English stage actresses
Living people
People educated at Hummersknott Academy
1971 births
Actresses from Cambridgeshire